Pebble Creek may refer to:

Pebble Creek, Florida, an unincorporated community
Pebble Creek, Idaho, an alpine ski area
Pebble Creek (Missouri), a stream in Missouri
Pebble Creek (Elkhorn River), a river in Nebraska
Pebble Creek Formation, a volcanic formation in British Columbia
Pebble Creek Hot Springs Pemberton Valley in British Columbia